Dispensing may refer to:

 Resin dispensing, an industrial process
 Remote dispensing, the use of automated systems to dispense prescription medications without an on-site pharmacist

See also
 Dispensation (disambiguation)
 Dispenser (disambiguation)